Sophie Dodemont (born August 30, 1973 in Pont-Sainte-Maxence) is a archer from France.

At the 2008 Summer Olympics in Beijing Dodemont finished her ranking round with a total of 632 points. This gave her the 32nd seed for the final competition bracket in which she faced Anja Hitzler in the first round. Hitzler won the confrontation between the 32nd and 33rd seed with 107-106 and Dodemont was eliminated.

Together with Bérengère Schuh and Virginie Arnold she also took part in the team event. With her 632 score from the ranking round combined with the 645 of Schuh and the 626 of Arnold the French team was in fifth position after the ranking round, which gave them a straight seed into the quarter finals. With 218-211 they were too strong for the Polish team. In the semi final against South Korea they scored only 184 points with the Koreans scoring 213, missing out on the final. They recovered in the bronze medal match and won against Great Britain 203-201 to claim the bronze.

Dodemont later converted to the compound discipline, achieving success including a team bronze medal at the 2013 World Archery Championships and a team gold medal at the 2021 European Archery Championships in Antalya, Turkey.

She won the silver medal in the women's individual compound event at the 2022 European Archery Championships held in Munich, Germany.

References

External links
 Athlete bio at official Olympics site

1973 births
Living people
Sportspeople from Oise
French female archers
Olympic archers of France
Archers at the 2008 Summer Olympics
Olympic bronze medalists for France
Olympic medalists in archery
Medalists at the 2008 Summer Olympics
World Archery Championships medalists
Archers at the 2019 European Games
European Games medalists in archery
European Games bronze medalists for France
20th-century French women
21st-century French women